Blessing Sarupinda (born 4 May 1999) is a Zimbabwean footballer who plays for CAPS United on loan from Sekhukhune United, and the Zimbabwe national team.

Club career
Sarupinda played for Aces Soccer Academy as a youth. He played for Black Rhinos F.C. of the Zimbabwe Premier Soccer League in 2018 before moving to fellow Premier League side CAPS United in 2019.

In February 2021 it was reported by local media that Sarupinda was close to a move to Europe and was in negotiations with S.C. Olhanense. He was ultimately not signed because a lack of fitness. He had impressed the club during a trial the previous year but the move was postponed because of the COVID-19 pandemic. When Sarupinda returned home in March 2020 and again in 2021 he re-joined CAPS United.

Later in 2021 Sarupinda eventually signed for Sekhukhune United of the South African Premier Division ahead of the 2021–22 season. By January 2022 he had made just four appearances for the club. It was announced at this time that he would be joining JDR Stars F.C. of the GladAfrica Championship on loan for the remainder of the season.

In the summer of 2022 he was loaned to his old club CAPS United.

International career
Sarupinda made his senior international debut on 7 July 2021 in the team's opening match of the 2021 COSAFA Cup against Mozambique. Two days later, he scored his for international goal for Zimbabwe in a 2-2 draw with Malawi.

International goals
Scores and results list Zimbabwe's goal tally first.

International career statistics

References

1999 births
Living people
Zimbabwean footballers
Zimbabwe international footballers
Association football midfielders
Black Rhinos F.C. players
CAPS United players
Sekhukhune United F.C. players
JDR Stars F.C. players
Zimbabwean expatriate footballers
Expatriate soccer players in South Africa
Zimbabwean expatriate sportspeople in South Africa
South African Premier Division players
National First Division players